François Le Vot is a fighter pilot in the French air force, presenter and international competitor in aerobatics, most notably in the Red Bull Air Race. He was leader of the aerobatic team of the French Air Force and was 2013 Aerobatics World Champion.

Biography
Le Vot made his Red Bull Air Race debut in the 2014 Challenger Cup, winning races in Abu Dhabi, Rovinj and Putrajaya and ending up at 4th place in 2014 Challenger Cup after final winner-takes-all race. He moved up into the Master Class in 2015, however neither his nor fellow debutant Juan Velarde's race-planes were as fast as their competitors' (estimates range between 10-15 knots down) and both failed to score a point all season. Having resolved the issue in the off-season, Le Vot placed third in the first round of 2016 in Abu Dhabi.

Results

References

External links

 Francois Le Vot

1970 births
Living people
French aviators
French air racers
Red Bull Air Race World Championship pilots